Écoivres is a commune in the Pas-de-Calais department in the Hauts-de-France region of France.

A hamlet with the same name is to be found in the commune of Mont-Saint-Eloi.

Geography

Population

Places of interest
 The church of St.Martin, dating from the sixteenth century.
 Traces of an old castle.

See also
Communes of the Pas-de-Calais department

References

Communes of Pas-de-Calais